Lukáš Hvila (born November 30, 1981) is a Slovak professional ice hockey left winger who currently plays for HK Dukla Michalovce in the Tipsport Liga.

Hvila previously played for HK Poprad, HC Košice, MsHK Žilina, HKm Zvolen, HC '05 Banská Bystrica and HC Nové Zámky. He also played 49 games in the Czech Extraliga for HC Plzeň during the 2009–10 season.

References

External links

1981 births
Living people
HK Acroni Jesenice players
HC '05 Banská Bystrica players
Beibarys Atyrau players
HK Dukla Michalovce players
HC Košice players
HC Nové Zámky players
HC Plzeň players
HK Poprad players
Slovak ice hockey left wingers
HK Spišská Nová Ves players
Sportspeople from Poprad
MsHK Žilina players
HKM Zvolen players
Slovak expatriate ice hockey players in the Czech Republic
Expatriate ice hockey players in Kazakhstan
Expatriate ice hockey players in France
Expatriate ice hockey players in Poland
Slovak expatriate sportspeople in Kazakhstan
Slovak expatriate sportspeople in France
Slovak expatriate sportspeople in Poland